Xiong Dezhi (born 29 April 1988) is a Paralympian athlete from China competing mainly in T38 classification sprint events. Xiong represented her country at the 2012 Summer Paralympics in London, where she a silver as part of the women's 4 × 100 m relay (T35-38). She also competed in the 100m and 200m (T38) sprint events, just finishing outside the medals in fourth position in both.

Personal history
Xiong was born in Yunnan, China in 1988. She has cerebral palsy.

Notes

Paralympic athletes of China
Athletes (track and field) at the 2012 Summer Paralympics
Paralympic silver medalists for China
Living people
1988 births
Medalists at the 2012 Summer Paralympics
Chinese female sprinters
Runners from Yunnan
Paralympic medalists in athletics (track and field)
21st-century Chinese women